El Chicano was an American brown-eyed soul group from Los Angeles, California, whose style incorporated various modern music genres including rock, funk, soul, blues, jazz, and salsa. The group's name was from Chicano, a term for United States citizens of typically Mexican descent.

History
El Chicano, originally formed by Freddie Sanchez under the name The VIP's arose during a period of increasing Chicano consciousness in America. Their initial hit, "Viva Tirado", was a jazzy soul rock rendition of Gerald Wilson's original song about a bullfighter.  The song did very well on Los Angeles radio and remained #1 for thirteen straight weeks. Other notable tracks recorded by El Chicano are the funky "Tell Her She's Lovely" as well as a cover of Van Morrison's 1967 hit, "Brown Eyed Girl".

Original members of El Chicano include Bobby Espinosa, Freddie Sanchez, Mickey Lespron, Andre Baeza, and John De Luna. Ersi Arvisu was lead singer. During the 1970s, new members Rudy Regalado, Max Garduno, Danny Lamonte, Brian Magness, Jerry Salas, Joe Pererria. joined the group.

On their 1970 album, Viva Tirado the group covered Herbie Hancock's jazz standard "Cantaloupe Island". The song was one of nine on the album, which included the hit single "Viva Tirado" that went gold.

El Chicano continues to be active with a combination of original and new members. They performed on the 2009 PBS pledge break special, Trini Lopez Presents 'The Legends of Latin Rock' , along with Thee Midniters, Tierra, and Gregg Rolie (of Santana and Journey fame).

Original keyboardist, Bobby Espinosa ‒ who laid down Hammond organ on some of El Chicano's most recognizable tracks ‒ died on February 27, 2010. Former percussionist, Rudy Regalado, who spent twelve years with the band died on November 4, 2010.  Latin percussionist of former Santana renown, Walfredo Reyes Jr., recorded with the band from 2010 to 2012, and is currently performing with the band Chicago.

Members
 Ersi Arvisu, lead vocals – 1970
 Eddie Avila , drums (2010–present)
 Andre Baeza, congas – 1970
 John De Luna, drums – 1970
 Bobby Espinosa, organ – 1970; died February 27, 2010
 Max Garduno, congas
 Danny Lamonte, drums
 Mickey Lespron, guitar – 1970
 Brian Magness, bass
 Joe Perreria, bass 
 Rudy Regalado, timbales – joined c. 1971; died November 4, 2010
 Walfredo "Wally" Reyes, Jr., drums, congas (2010–2012)
 Joseph Baeza, congas (2011–2013); died October 18, 2016
 David "Chango" Chavez, congas (2015–present) 
 Jerry Salas, lead vocals, guitar – joined in 1973
 Rudy Salas,vocals – 1970; died December 29, 2020
 Steve Salas, vocals – 1970; died February 10, 2022
 Freddie Sanchez, bass – 1970

Discography

Albums

Main singles

See also
Chicano rock

References

External links
 
 

1969 establishments in California
2000 disestablishments in California
Musical groups from Los Angeles
American soul musical groups
Rock music groups from California
Chicano rock musicians
MCA Records artists
Musical groups established in 1969
Musical groups disestablished in 2000